8 Mile is a 2002 American drama film written by Scott Silver and directed by Curtis Hanson. It stars Eminem in his film debut, alongside Mekhi Phifer, Brittany Murphy, Michael Shannon, Anthony Mackie, and Kim Basinger. The film, which contains autobiographical elements from Eminem's life, follows white rapper Jimmy Smith Jr. aka B-Rabbit (Eminem) and his attempt to launch a career in hip hop, a music genre dominated by African-Americans. The title is derived from 8 Mile Road, the highway between the predominantly African-American city of Detroit and the largely white suburban communities to the north that Eminem originally lived in.

8 Mile was a critical and box office success. The album's accompanying soundtrack was also a commercial success, being certified quadruple platinum by the Recording Industry Association of America (RIAA). The film garnered numerous award nominations and wins, including an Academy Award for Best Original Song for "Lose Yourself" win for Eminem, Jeff Bass and Luis Resto at the 75th Academy Awards. 8 Mile was named one of the best films of 2002 by several publications.

Plot
In 1995, Jimmy is an aspiring rapper who performs under the stage name B-Rabbit. Jimmy is a blue-collar worker from a poor family who now are residing in a trailer park in Detroit. Jimmy has moved to the run-down trailer home of his alcoholic mother Stephanie, his sister Lily, and Stephanie's abusive live-in boyfriend Greg. Although encouraged by his friends, Jimmy worries about his potential as a rapper. One night, Jimmy chokes during a rap battle at a local venue, the Shelter, and he leaves the stage humiliated.

During the day, Jimmy works at a car factory. Desperate for money, he asks for extra shifts, but his supervisor bluntly dismisses his request because of his habitual tardiness. Later on, Jimmy befriends a woman named Alex, and he begins to take more responsibility for the direction of his life.

Stephanie discovers an eviction notice as Jimmy is getting ready for work. Despite her best attempts to keep the eviction notice a secret, Greg discovers it and confronts Stephanie. When Jimmy punches Greg for pushing his mother to the ground, they fight, ending in Greg leaving Stephanie for good.

Jimmy's friendship with Wink, who has ties to a record label promoter, becomes strained after he discovers that Wink does promotional work for Jimmy's rivals, a rap group known as the "Leaders of the Free World". At one point, Jimmy and his friends get into a violent brawl with the Free World crew, which is disrupted when Jimmy's friend Cheddar pulls out a gun and accidentally shoots himself in the leg; he survives after being rushed to the hospital.

During a lunch break at work, one of Jimmy's co-workers performs a freestyle rap insulting a gay co-worker, Paul. Jimmy raps a freestyle defending Paul. Alex arrives and is impressed by Jimmy's actions, and they have sex. Wink arranges for Jimmy to meet with producers at a recording studio, but Jimmy finds Wink and Alex having sex. Enraged, Jimmy attacks Wink as Alex tries to break them up. In retaliation, Wink and the Leaders of the Free World assault Jimmy outside his trailer. The leader of the gang, Papa Doc, holds Jimmy at gunpoint and threatens to kill him, but Wink convinces him not to do it. After the group has left Jimmy alone, his mother arrives with enough money to pay to avoid eviction, having won $3,200 at a bingo tournament.

Jimmy's best friend and battle host, Future, pushes him to get revenge by competing against the Leaders of the Free World at the next rap battle. Jimmy agrees, but his boss, having noticed improved effort at work, asks Jimmy to do a late-night shift. He agrees, but it conflicts with the battle at the Shelter. Alex unexpectedly visits Jimmy at work. She says goodbye, as she is going to New York, and she is hoping to see Jimmy at the Shelter later. This motivates Jimmy to do the battle. He asks Paul to cover the start of his shift as a favor while Jimmy goes to the battle.

In all rounds of the rap battle, Jimmy has to compete against one member of the Free World crew. After handily winning the first two rounds against Lyckety-Splyt and Lotto, he faces Papa Doc. Going first, Jimmy pre-empts Papa Doc's potential insults, acknowledging his own "white trash" roots and difficult life. He ends his battle repudiating Papa Doc's image as a thug by exposing his privileged background; having attended a private school in a wealthy suburb and living in a stable, two-parent household. Embarrassed and with nothing to say in rebuttal, Papa Doc hands the microphone back to Future, conceding the battle.

After being congratulated by Alex and his friends, Jimmy is offered a position by Future co-hosting battles at the Shelter. Jimmy declines, saying that hosting is Future's thing, and he needs to do his own, and leaves to return to work.

Cast
 Eminem as Jimmy, a rapper who uses the stage name "B-Rabbit"
 Kim Basinger as Stephanie, Jimmy and Lily's mother
 Mekhi Phifer as Future, Jimmy's best friend and the rap battle host
 Brittany Murphy as Alex, Jimmy's love interest
 Evan Jones as Cheddar Bob, Jimmy's slow-witted yet loyal friend
 Omar Benson Miller as Sol George, Jimmy's friend and Iz's brother
 De'Angelo Wilson as DJ Iz, Jimmy's friend and Sol's brother
 Eugene Byrd as Wink, a radio DJ
 Taryn Manning as Janeane, Jimmy's ex-girlfriend
 DJ Head as Battle DJ
 Michael Shannon as Greg Buehl, Stephanie's boyfriend and former classmate of Jimmy and Future
 Chloe Greenfield as Lily, Jimmy's sister
 Anthony Mackie as Papa Doc, leader of the Free World
 Multiple cameos including:
 Brandon T. Jackson
 Proof
 Obie Trice
 Njeri Earth
 Xzibit

Production
The film started production in 2000. Shooting began in September 2001 in Highland Park, Michigan. Eminem was linked to both Brittany Murphy and Kim Basinger during filming. He denied being romantically involved with Basinger, while Murphy confirmed reports that she dated him. Prior to Hanson hiring, Quentin Tarantino and Danny Boyle were considered to direct the film. Seth Rogen and Jason Segel were considered for Cheddar Bob.

Music

Music from and Inspired by the Motion Picture 8 Mile is the soundtrack to 8 Mile. Eminem features on five tracks from the album. It was released under the Shady/Interscope label and spawned Eminem's first number 1 US single "Lose Yourself". The album debuted at number one on the U.S. Billboard 200 Albums Chart that year, with over 702,000 copies sold, and a further 507,000 copies were sold in the second week, also finishing the year as the fifth-best-selling album of 2002, with US sales of 3.2 million despite being on the market for only two months.

Reception

Box office
8 Mile opened with $51,240,555 in its opening weekend, the then second-highest opening for an R-rated movie in the U.S, after Hannibal. It topped the box office upon opening, beating The Santa Clause 2. During its second weekend, the film dropped into second place behind Harry Potter and the Chamber of Secrets, making $21.3 million. The film would go on to gross $116,750,901 domestically and $126,124,177 overseas, for a total of $242,875,078 worldwide.

In Slovenia, the film made an opening gross of $18,000, making it the fourth-highest opening for a Universal film in the country, behind Twister, The Lost World: Jurassic Park and Bridget Jones's Diary.

Critical reception
8 Mile received positive reviews, with critics praising the music and Eminem's debut performance. Review aggregator Rotten Tomatoes reports the film is "Certified Fresh", with 75% of 214 professional critics giving the film a positive review and a rating average of 6.70/10. The site's consensus is that "Even though the story is overly familiar, there's enough here for an engaging ride." On Metacritic, which assigns a weighted mean rating out of 100 reviews from film critics, the film has a rating score of 77 based on 38 reviews, which indicates "generally favorable reviews". CinemaScore polls conducted during the opening weekend revealed the average grade cinemagoers gave 8 Mile was B+ on an A+ to F scale, with the core under-21 demographics giving it an A.

Roger Ebert gave the film 3 out of 4 stars. He said that we "are hardly started in 8 Mile, and already we see that this movie stands aside from routine debut films by pop stars" and that it is "a faithful reflection of his myth". He said that Eminem, as an actor, is "convincing without being too electric" and "survives the X-ray truth-telling of the movie camera" In the At the Movies with Ebert and Roeper review, both Ebert and Richard Roeper gave the film a thumbs up; Roeper said that Eminem has a "winning screen presence" and "raw magic" to him. He was happy with Rabbit's "tender side" presented through his relationship with the "adorable" Greenfield as his sister, but felt that Basinger was "really miscast". Roeper said: "8 Mile probably won't win converts to rap, but it should thrill Eminem fans."

Peter Travers gave the film 3.5 out of 4 stars. He said that 8 Mile "is a real movie, not a fast-buck package to exploit the fan base of a rap nonentity" that "qualifies as a cinematic event by tapping into the roots of Eminem and the fury and feeling that inform his rap." He praised Hanson's directing and the performances and compared the final battle with Papa Doc to the fight between Rocky Balboa and Apollo Creed in Rocky.

Top lists
8 Mile has been named in various year-end and all-time top lists:
 2nd – Billboard (Erika Ramirez): Top 10 Best Hip-Hop Movies Ever
 7th – The New York Observer (Andrew Sarris): The 10 Best English-Language Films of 2002
 9th – Time (Richard Schickel): Top 10 Movies of 2002
 10th – Rolling Stone (Peter Travers): The Best Movies of 2002
 N/A – The Daily Californian: Best Films of 2002

Awards and honors
In 2003, Eminem won the Academy Award for Best Original Song at the 75th Academy Awards, for his single "Lose Yourself" from the soundtrack of 8 Mile, becoming the first rapper ever to win an Academy Award. He was not present at the ceremony, but co-writer Luis Resto accepted the award. The film has been nominated for 32 awards, winning 11. 17 years later, Eminem performed the song in a surprise appearance at the 2020 Academy Awards.

The film is recognized by American Film Institute in these lists:
 2004: AFI's 100 Years...100 Songs:
 "Lose Yourself" – 
 2006: AFI's 100 Years...100 Cheers – Nominated

Home media
8 Mile was first released on VHS and DVD on March 18, 2003. On November 15 of that year, it was released on UMD. The DVD generated $75 million in sales and rentals in its first week, making it the biggest DVD debut ever for an R-rated movie and putting it in the all-time Top 10 for first week home video sales for a movie. It was later released on Blu-ray on April 14, 2009. It was released on Ultra HD Blu-ray on November 8, 2022, for the 20 year anniversary of the release.

See also 
 List of hood films

References

Sources

External links
 
 
 
 
 
 
 

2000s hip hop films
2002 drama films
2002 films
African-American drama films
American coming-of-age drama films
2000s English-language films
Films about dysfunctional families
Films about race and ethnicity
Films directed by Curtis Hanson
Films produced by Brian Grazer
Films set in 1995
Films set in Detroit
Films set in the 1990s
Films shot in Detroit
Films shot in Michigan
Films that won the Best Original Song Academy Award
Films with screenplays by Scott Silver
Hood films
Imagine Entertainment films
Universal Pictures films
2000s American films